Popular culture studies is the study of popular culture from a critical theory perspective combining communication studies and cultural studies. The first institution to offer bachelor's and master's degrees in Popular Culture is the Bowling Green State University Department of Popular Culture founded by Ray B. Browne.

See also
Buffy studies
Madonna studies
Tolkien research

References

External links
Communications studies resources - University of Iowa
Cultural Studies Central
Popular Culture Association and American Culture Association (PCA/ACA)

 
Popular culture
Cultural studies
American studies